Luciana Andrea Echeverría Christie (born 12 July 1991) is a Chilean actor, singer, and television presenter.

Filmography

Movies

Television

Shows 
 Cubox (Canal 13, 2010) – Herself/Presenter

References

Other websites 
 

1991 births
People from Cauquenes
Living people
21st-century Chilean women singers
Chilean film actresses
Chilean telenovela actresses
Chilean television actresses
Chilean television presenters
Chilean people of Basque descent
Chilean women television presenters